Garfield is an unincorporated community in Bonner County, in the U.S. state of Idaho. The community is situated on Garfield Bay, an inlet of Lake Pend Oreille.

History
A variant name is "Midas". A post office called Midas was established in 1909, and remained in operation until 1939.

Midas' population was estimated at 50 in 1960.

References

Unincorporated communities in Bonner County, Idaho